George Philips may refer to:

 Sir George Philips, 1st Baronet (1766–1847), English Member of Parliament
 Sir George Philips, 2nd Baronet (1789–1874), son of the 1st Baronet, English Member of Parliament
 George Philips (cricketer) (1831–1886), English first-class cricketer

See also
 George Phillips (disambiguation)
 George Philip (disambiguation)